Piera Coppola (born April 22, 1968) is an American voice actress.

Voice over roles

Film
Joseph: King of Dreams (2000) — Zuleika's servant, additional voices

Television 
The Batman (2005) — Pamela Lilian Isley / Poison Ivy

Video games 
Warcraft III: Reign of Chaos (2002) — Sylvanas Windrunner
Warcraft III: The Frozen Throne (2003) — Sylvanas Windrunner
World of Warcraft (2004) — Sylvanas Windrunner
Neopets: The Darkest Faerie (2005) — The Darkest Faerie (Created for Sony PlayStation 2 with Neopets)
Rise of the Argonauts (2008) — Medea
Warcraft III: Reforged (2020) — Sylvanas Windrunner

References

External links

American video game actresses
1968 births
American voice actresses
Living people
Place of birth missing (living people)
21st-century American women